The "Golden Girls" of Bulgaria refers to the generation of female rhythmic gymnasts who represented Bulgaria from 1976 to 1999 when the team was coached by Neshka Robeva. In this period, the Golden Girls won 14 Rhythmic Gymnastics World Championships titles in individual and ensemble performances; 14  Rhythmic Gymnastics European Championships titles, and an assortment of other world and European titles. 

The most prominent gymnasts of the Golden Girls are Adriana Dunavska, Anelia Ralenkova, Bianka Panova, Diliana Georgieva, Elizabeth Koleva, Iliana Raeva, Julia Baicheva, Lilia Ignatova, and Maria Petrova. Among them, they won over 200 medals in 20 years. Bianka Panova became the first rhythmic gymnast to win all five individual events at a world championship. She was entered into the Guinness World Records for receiving full 10 marks in all eight routines at a world championship. Maria Petrova, along with earlier gymnast Maria Gigova, were both three-time world all-around champions; Petrova is also a three-time European all-around champion.

Nowadays all golden girls have different coaches.The most popular from 2016-2022 are Neviana Vladinova, Katrin Taseva, Boryana Kaleyn, Stiliana Nikolova, Eva Brezalieva and Tatiana Volozhanina in Senior individual.

References

Further reading 

 The Golden Girls of Bulgaria by Neshka Robeva, Margarita Rangelova (1985), Sofia, Bulgaria: Sofia Press

Nicknamed groups of Olympic competitors
Bulgarian rhythmic gymnasts